The men's 4 × 400 metres relay event at the 2016 African Championships in Athletics was held on 26 June in Kings Park Stadium.

Results

References

The squads have been compiled from various sources including this video of the race where some athlete bibs are visible.
http://www.athleticskenya.or.ke/wp-content/uploads/2014/04/20th-CAA-Africa-Senior-Championshiops-Durban-Results-2016.pdf

2016 African Championships in Athletics
Relays at the African Championships in Athletics